The  are a Japanese women's softball team based in Kakegawa, Shizuoka. The Red Falcons compete in the Japan Diamond Softball League (JD.League) as a member of the league's East Division.

History
The Red Falcons were founded in 1983, as NEC Shizuoka (a factory of NEC) softball team.

The Japan Diamond Softball League (JD.League) was founded in 2022, and the Red Falcons became part of the new league as a member of the East Division.

Roster

References

External links
 
 NEC Platforms Red Falcons - JD.League

Japan Diamond Softball League
Women's softball teams in Japan
Sports teams in Shizuoka Prefecture